Vineridine (vineridin) is a vinca alkaloid.

References

Vinca alkaloids
Tryptamine alkaloids
Indolizidines